Stoney LaRue (born Stoney Larue Phillips in 1977) is an American Texas Country/Red Dirt artist.

Life and career
Born in Taft, Texas, LaRue was raised in Yanush/Buffalo Valley, Oklahoma where he still visits regularly and began playing country music at a young age.

LaRue moved to Stillwater, Oklahoma, and began to play in the various bars around the college town, as well as his brother, Bo Phillips. He befriended Jason Boland and Cody Canada and the three moved into the infamous "Yellow House" where they would have late night jam sessions and entertain other various musicians around the town, like Mike McClure and Brandon Jenkins. LaRue was heavily influenced by Woody Guthrie, Bob Childers, Mike Hosty and the "Red Dirt" music scene. 
 
In 2002, LaRue led The Organic Boogie Band and released Downtown, recorded in private sessions at Cain's Ballroom in Tulsa. LaRue's 2005 follow-up, The Red Dirt Album, reached the Billboard sales charts in its debut week. The next year, Stoney released his first live record Live at Billy Bob's Texas.

LaRue sang backing vocals on Miranda Lambert's 2013 single "All Kinds of Kinds."

Legal Issues 
On the morning of July 20, 2015, LaRue was arrested and charged with domestic abuse after an altercation involving his then girlfriend Amanda Winsworth. Winsworth claimed in court documents that she was getting ready for work when LaRue began physically assaulting her and ultimately pushed her down a flight of stairs in their home. LaRue was released from jail on $4,000 bond later that day. The next morning, Winsworth rescinded part of her account of the assault on Twitter stating that the incident had been blown out of proportion by the media.

Discography

Albums

Music videos

References

External links
Larue's biography at CMT
Larue's biography at Lonestar Music

Living people
People from San Patricio County, Texas
Singer-songwriters from Oklahoma
American country singer-songwriters
1977 births
Singer-songwriters from Texas
21st-century American singers
Country musicians from Texas
Country musicians from Oklahoma